Laraki Automobiles SA is a Moroccan manufacturer of high-performance sports cars based in Casablanca, Morocco.

History 
Laraki was established in 1999 by Abdesslam Laraki, a Moroccan designer and entrepreneur who first became wealthy by importing cars in Morocco beginning in 1973. His son and the current owner of the firm is Abdeslam Laraki, a Moroccan designer who started out creating luxurious yachts and created the eponym company Laraki. Then following the steps of his father, he studied automobile design in Switzerland and soon after launched his first model, the Laraki Fulgura, in 2002.

In 2012, the conceptual artist Eric Van Hove arrived in Marrakech to resume work on an ambitious sculptural endeavor he had prepared for years: V12 Laraki. In the space of nine months, he gathered around him 42 master craftsmen from the region and began rebuilding a Mercedes 6.2 L V12 engine using rural materials and centuries old craft techniques from the North African country. Conceptually, this sculpture is based on the story of the Laraki Fulgura, which was entirely manufactured in Morocco to the exception of its engine. The artist decided to try and reproduce that cutting-edge component locally using craft That sculpture was displayed at the 5th Marrakech Biennale and soon acquired by the Hood Museum of Art.

The technical director is Peter Tutzer, previously from Bugatti.

Models

Fulgura

The Laraki Fulgura is the company's first attempt at a sports car. Originally unveiled as a concept at the 2002 Geneva Motor Show, a proposed production version debuted a year later at the same show. A slightly redesigned version of the bodywork was unveiled in 2005.

Based on the frame and mechanicals of a Lamborghini Diablo, the Fulgura is equipped with a quad-turbo Mercedes-Benz 6.0 L V12, initially proposed to produce , attached to a 6-speed manual transmission. A new aerodynamic carbon fibre body is also added. This brings the Fulgura to an estimated price of $555,750. Also cheaper V8 version of the Fulgara has 5.4 L supercharged M113 engine which produses 570 hp.

Borac

The Laraki Borac is the company's second model, and debuted as a concept at the 2005 Geneva Motor Show. The car was originally planned for production by 2011, but a final design was never unveiled.

The design of the Borac is that of a grand tourer, with a front engine layout and even the possibility of two small rear seats. The Borac is not based on an existing design, unlike the Fulgura. A Mercedes-Benz 6.0 L V12 powers the Borac, although it lacks the turbocharging of the Fulgura.

Epitome

The Laraki Epitome was unveiled at the Pebble Beach Concours d'Elegance in 2013. Nine cars of this model are planned to be built.

Fitted with the V8 engine of a C6 Chevrolet Corvette, Laraki added twin turbochargers to the already powerful engine. Fueled by 91-octane gasoline fuel, the Epitome can produce 1,200 Horsepower. Additionally it has a second fuel tank that can be filled with 110-octane gasoline fuel, which can up it to 1,750 Horsepower. The body is made of carbon fiber. The car weighs 2,800 pounds.

The Epitome made the headlines: With a $2 million price tag, it was dubbed the most expensive car on the market. Hip-hop artist French Montana bought one of the 9 models planned for production.

References

External links
  Official website

Car manufacturers of Morocco
Sports car manufacturers
Luxury motor vehicle manufacturers
Companies based in Casablanca
Vehicle manufacturing companies established in 1999
1999 establishments in Morocco
Moroccan brands